The Port Harcourt Refining Company, (abbreviated PHRC), is a Nigeria-based oil and gas company primarily specializing in the refining of crude oil into petroleum products. It is headquartered in Port Harcourt metropolitan area of Rivers State, southeastern Nigeria. The company is a subsidiary of the Nigerian National Petroleum Corporation (NNPC).

See also

Omega Butler Refinery

References

External links
PHRC web page

Companies based in Port Harcourt
Economy of Port Harcourt
Oil and gas companies of Nigeria
Manufacturing companies of Nigeria
Landmarks in Port Harcourt
Energy in Rivers State
1960s establishments in Rivers State
Nigerian companies established in 1965